Park Seo-ham, born Park Gyeong-bok on October 28, 1993, is a South Korean actor, singer, and rapper. He is a former member of the South Korean boyband KNK. As an actor, he is best known for his role as Jang Jae-young in the web novel-adapted BL drama series Semantic Error.

Career

Pre-debut 
Along with Inseong, he used to train under Big Hit Entertainment, now known as Big Hit Music where they both trained with the members of the boy group BTS. When he moved to JYP Entertainment, he became an actor trainee after he won second place at the company's 10th Open Audition on February 19, 2013.

Before debuting with KNK, he was a backup dancer for the live performances of BESTie's Zzang Christmas as well as I Need You.

2016–2021: Debut with KNK 
Park made his official debut as one of the five members of KNK on March 3, 2016, with the name Park Seung-jun. In 2018, he changed his name to Park Seo-ham. This is his third name following the change of Park Gyeong-bok to Park Seung-jun. 

On September 30, 2021, it was announced that he has decided to leave KNK and 220 Entertainment after long discussions with the members regarding the future of his career.

2022: Semantic Error and Npio Entertainment 
On January 12, 2022, South Korean streaming television series Watcha announced Park to take the lead role in the live series adaption of Semantic Error, based from a popular South Korean BL web novel of the same name. He starred as Jang Jae-young, alongside DKZ member Park Jae-chan as his character's love interest Chu Sang-woo.

On March 7, 2022, Npio Entertainment announced they signed an exclusive contract with Park ahead of his military enlistment.

Personal life

Military service 
On March 4, 2022, Sports Chosun released an interview with Park where they revealed that he would be enlisting as a social worker on March 10.

Filmography

Film

Television series

Web series

Television show

Awards and nominations

Listicles

Notes

References

External links

 
 
 Park Seo-ham at Npio Entertainment

1993 births
Living people
People from Siheung
21st-century South Korean singers
21st-century South Korean male actors
South Korean male rappers
South Korean male idols
South Korean male singers
South Korean male television actors